Saivodus is a genus of ctenacanthiform fish from the Carboniferous period. Fossils have been found in North America.

Taxonomy
Saivodus was erected in 2006. The single species belonging to this genus was formerly included in the unrelated genus Cladodus.

Description
The shape of the teeth suggest it targeted soft-bodied prey.

References

Prehistoric cartilaginous fish genera
Carboniferous sharks